Desigar Ramanujam (17 July 1907 – 4 June 1968) was a Ceylonese trade unionist and politician.

Desigar Ramanujam was born in Ramanathapuram, India on 17 July 1907. Upon completing his higher studies he having commenced a career in journalism. In the late 1920s, Ramanujam, an accomplished writer, came to Sri Lanka joining the editorial staff of a Tamil newspaper, Desa Bakthan.

In 1934 he joined the teaching staff at Dharmaraja College in Kandy. He went on to form an association to safeguard the rights of the Indian workers, Bose Sangam, whose membership encompassed the villages of Mahaiyawa and Asgiriya. This association was subsequently dissolved following the formation of Ceylon Indian Congress in 1950, of which Ramanujam was a founding member.

He was elected to the Kandy Municipal Council in 1943, representing the Asgiriya ward, and in 1946 he became the first person of recent Indian origin to be appointed the Deputy Mayor of Kandy.

Ramanujam was elected at the 1st parliamentary election, held between 23 August 1947 and 20 September 1947, representing the Ceylon India Congress in the Alutnuwara electorate, securing 46.6% of the total vote, 1,437 votes ahead of his nearest rival.

Ramanujam was one of seven CIC members elected to parliament in 1947.

In 1961 Prime Minister Sirimavo Bandaranaike offered Ramanujam an appointed seat in Parliament, but he declined it in favour of the President of Ceylon Workers Congress, Savumiamoorthy Thondaman.

In 1962, the International Confederation of Free Trade Unions (ICFTU) invited him to join their organisation, where he was given the task of organising the sugar plantation workers trade union movement in Mauritius. He was subsequently was sent to Ethiopia to establish trade unions there. In 1965 the ICFTU appointed Ramanujam as its Special Representative in Singapore and later as the organization's Regional Director in South East Asia.

In June 1968, the ICFTU appointed Ramanujam the Director of Asian Regional Office, based in India however he died suddenly on 4 June 1968, at the age of 61, before he could take up that posting.

References

1907 births
1968 deaths
Ceylon Workers' Congress politicians
Indian Tamil politicians of Sri Lanka
Indian Tamil teachers of Sri Lanka
Indian Tamil trade unionists of Sri Lanka
Members of the 1st Parliament of Ceylon
Sri Lankan municipal councillors